Zahran  may refer to:
 Zahran district, a district in Amman
 Zahran Palace, a palace in Jordan
 Zahrani River, a river in Southern Lebanon
 Zahran, Iran, an alternate romanized name for Zarean in West Azerbaijan Province, Iran
 Zahran tribe, a branch of the Azd tribe